This is a list of events in British radio during 1989.

Events

January
1 January – London "pirate" radio presenter Sammy Jacob, known as DJ Sammy Jay, sets up part-time "pirate" indie music station Q102, predecessor of Radio X.
15 January – Pick of the Pops is revived by BBC Radio 1. The show takes on a new classic hits format and features three past charts from three different decades each week. Alan Freeman returns to Radio 1 to present the programme.

February
No events.

March
10 March – Les Ross leaves the BRMB breakfast show to move to BRMB's forthcoming classic hits service Xtra AM. He had presented the  programme for thirteen years.

April
1 April – BBC Radio 1 starts broadcasting slightly earlier each morning and is now on air between 5am and 2am seven days a week.

May
May – The BBC Night Network is launched on the BBC's six local radio stations in Yorkshire and north east England. It provides all six stations with a daily evening service, thereby keeping the stations on air with regional programming until midnight. All local evening programming – mainly local sport and programming for ethnic minorities – is broadcast as an opt-out but is only aired on the station's AM frequencies.
1 May – Classic Gold launches on the MW transmitters of Pennine Radio, Viking Radio and Radio Hallam.
26 May – BBC Radio 4 airs the 10,000th episode of The Archers.

June
No events.

July
3 July – Simon Bates and producer Jonathan Ruffle set off on an 80-day circumnavigation of the world to raise money for Oxfam. Their progress is charted on BBC Radio 1 in a broadcast each weekday morning.
4 July – A new transmitter for DevonAir is switched on allowing the station to expand its transmission area to East Devon, West Dorset and South Somerset. The relay broadcasts under the name of South West 103.

August
No events.

September
1 September – The Ireland-based long wave station Atlantic 252 is launched. Operated by RTÉ it broadcasts to both Ireland and the United Kingdom. The first presenter to be heard is Gary King who announces at 8am: "Mine is the first voice you will ever hear on Atlantic 252." The station broadcasts only during the day – between 6am and 7pm – and at closedown invites listeners to tune in to Radio Luxembourg.

October
1 October – BBC Radio 2 begins a series of Sunday afternoon performances of works by Gilbert and Sullivan. The 12-week series, which runs until Christmas, replaces the station’s usual Sunday afternoon schedule.
2 October – LBC is replaced on FM by news and comment station LBC Crown FM.
22 October – The first of the Independent Broadcasting Authority’s series of incremental radio stations launches when Sunset 102 begins broadcasting to Manchester. More than 20 licenses are issued, allowing new stations to start broadcasting in areas already served by independent local radio. The stations come on air in 1989 and 1990.

November
13 November – London Greek Radio and WNK become the first stations in the UK to share a frequency. They alternate every four hours.

December
19 December – BBC Radio 1 starts transmitting on FM across the whole of south-east England (replacing the temporary London transmitter), in East Anglia and in the Cardigan Bay area.
30 December – BBC Radio 1 'borrows' BBC Radio 2's FM frequencies on a Saturday afternoon for the final time.

Unknown
City Talk 1548 AM becomes the UK's first all-talk radio station outside of London. The station broadcasts as an opt-out between the hours of 0700 and 1900 on weekdays, sharing content with Radio City's FM service outside these times. This approach differs from that taken by many other stations, which have begun launching "oldies" format stations on their former AM frequencies.
Radio Luxembourg launches a daytime schedule in English for the first time, the first since the early 1950s. It broadcasts the new 24-hour stereo schedule on the recently launched Astra 1A satellite to supplement the 208 analogue night-time service.
Southern Sound's broadcast area is expanded when it begins broadcasting to East Sussex.
WM Heartlands launches as a mid-morning experimental opt-out from BBC WM. It serves the 'Heartlands' area of East Birmingham using the station's 1458MW frequency.

Station debuts
15 January – WABC
14 February – BBC Hereford and Worcester
4 March – BBC Wiltshire Sound
27 March – Coast AM
31 March – 
MFM 97.1
Marcher Gold
4 April – Xtra AM (1989–1998)
8 April – Great North Radio (1989–1997)
1 May – Classic Gold
16 July – The Breeze
1 September – Atlantic 252 (1989–2002)
15 September – Fox FM
2 October – LBC Crown FM and London Newstalk
15 October – Horizon Radio
22 October – Sunset 102 (1989–1993)
5 November – Sunrise Radio
13 November – London Greek Radio and WNK
26 November – Orchard FM
2 December – CNFM
9 December – Sunrise Radio Yorkshire
Unknown – City Talk (1989–1991)

Closing this year
1 May – Viking Gold (1988–1989)

Programme debuts
 20 January – An Actor's Life For Me on BBC Radio 2 (1989–1993)
 March – The Mary Whitehouse Experience on BBC Radio 1 (1989–1990)
 26 April – Winston (Peter Tinniswood) on BBC Radio 4 (1988–1994)
 5 November – Sherlock Holmes on BBC Radio 4 (1989–1998)

Continuing radio programmes

1940s
 Sunday Half Hour (1940–2018)
 Desert Island Discs (1942–Present)
 Down Your Way (1946–1992)
 Letter from America (1946–2004)
 Woman's Hour (1946–Present)
 A Book at Bedtime (1949–Present)

1950s
 The Archers (1950–Present)
 The Today Programme (1957–Present)
 Sing Something Simple (1959–2001)
 Your Hundred Best Tunes (1959–2007)

1960s
 Farming Today (1960–Present)
 In Touch (1961–Present)
 The World at One (1965–Present)
 The Official Chart (1967–Present)
 Just a Minute (1967–Present)
 The Living World (1968–Present)
 The Organist Entertains (1969–2018)

1970s
 PM (1970–Present)
 Start the Week (1970–Present)
 Week Ending (1970–1998)
 You and Yours (1970–Present)
 I'm Sorry I Haven't a Clue (1972–Present)
 Good Morning Scotland (1973–Present)
 Kaleidoscope (1973–1998)
 Newsbeat (1973–Present)
 The News Huddlines (1975–2001)
 File on 4 (1977–Present)
 Money Box (1977–Present)
 The News Quiz (1977–Present)
 Breakaway (1979–1998)
 Feedback (1979–Present)
 The Food Programme (1979–Present)
 Science in Action (1979–Present)

1980s
 In Business (1983–Present)
 Sounds of the 60s (1983–Present)
 Loose Ends (1986–Present)
 Flying the Flag (1987–1992)
 Citizens (1987–1991)
 Top of the Pops (1988–1991)

Ending this year
 6 March – After Henry (1985–1989)

Births
20 January – Glenn Moore, newsreader and comedian
13 May – Katie Thistleton, broadcast presenter
25 September – Vick Hope, broadcast presenter

Deaths
27 January – Arthur Marshall, 78, broadcaster and humorous writer
10 July – Tommy Trinder, 80, radio, stage and screen comedian
22 August – Lord Hill, 85, physician, medical and broadcast executive, politician and "The Radio Doctor"
22 October – Ewan MacColl, 74, folk singer-songwriter, actor and labour activist, co-creator of the radio ballad
28 October – Henry Hall, 91, bandleader
31 October – Roger Scott, 46, disc jockey
2 November – Tom Mennard, 71, comedian
16 December – Marjorie Westbury, 84, radio actress and soprano

See also 
 1989 in British music
 1989 in British television
 1989 in the United Kingdom
 List of British films of 1989

References

Radio
British Radio, 1989 In
Years in British radio